George B. Wetzel (1865 – November 25, 1903) was an American baseball pitcher who started two games for the Baltimore Orioles in 1885.

Wetzel made his major league debut on August 26, 1885, and appeared in his final game on September 2. He went 0–2 in the two games he started, allowing 27 hits in 17 innings of work, walking 9 and striking out 6. He allowed 26 runs, 16 of which were earned, giving him an 8.47 earned run average.

Notes

References 

1865 births
1903 deaths
19th-century baseball players
Major League Baseball pitchers
Baltimore Orioles (AA) players
Lancaster (minor league baseball) players
Lancaster Ironsides players
Baltimore Monumentals (minor league) players
Boston Blues players
Utica Pent Ups players
Wilkes-Barre Coal Barons players
Mt. Carmel (minor league baseball) players
Shamokin Maroons players
Baseball players from Philadelphia